Stowe may refer to:

Places

United Kingdom
Stowe, Buckinghamshire, a civil parish and former village
Stowe House
Stowe School
Stowe, Cornwall, in Kilkhampton parish
Stowe, Herefordshire, in the List of places in Herefordshire
Stowe, Lincolnshire, a hamlet in Barholm and Stowe parish
Stowe, Shropshire, a small village and civil parish
Stowe-by-Chartley, Staffordshire, a village and civil parish
Stowe Pool, a reservoir in Lichfield, Staffordshire
Stowe, a corner of the Silverstone Circuit

United States
Stowe Township, Allegheny County, Pennsylvania
Stowe, Pennsylvania, a census-designated place
Stowe, Vermont, a town
Stowe Mountain Resort ski area
Stowe Recreation Path
Lake Stowe, Vermont
Stowe, West Virginia, an unincorporated community

Elsewhere
Stowe, Alberta, Canada
Stowe, Dominica

People
Barry Stowe (born 1957), American businessman
Calvin Ellis Stowe (1802–1886), American biblical scholar, husband of Harriet Beecher Stowe
Dorothy Stowe (1920–2010), social activist, environmentalist and a founder of Greenpeace
Emily Stowe (1831–1903), women's rights activist and the first female doctor in Canada
Hal Stowe (born 1937), American baseball player
Harriet Beecher Stowe (1811–1896), American abolitionist and author
Harry Stovey (1856–1937), American Major League Baseball player born Harry Duffield Stowe
Irving Stowe (1915–1974), American lawyer, activist and a founder of Greenpeace; husband of Dorothy Stowe
John Stowe (born 1966), American Catholic bishop
Kenneth Stowe (1927–2015), British senior civil servant
Leland Stowe (1899–1994), Pulitzer Prize-winning American journalist
Lyman Maynard Stowe (1914–1965), American physician and academic administrator
Madeleine Stowe (born 1958), American actress
Marilyn Stowe (born 1957), English solicitor
Otto Stowe (born 1949), former National Football League wide receiver
Reid Stowe (born 1952), American artist and sailor
Tyronne Stowe (born 1965), American retired National Football League linebacker
William Stowe (rower) (1940–2016), American rower
William Henry Stowe (1825–1855), British scholar and journalist
William McFerrin Stowe (1913–1988), American bishop of the Methodist and United Methodist Churches

Other uses
Stowe Open, a defunct tennis tournament
Stowe, Southern Railway (UK) SR V Schools class locomotive no. 928

See also
Stowe manuscripts, a collection in the British Library
Stowe Missal, an Irish illuminated manuscript
Stowe Breviary, an illuminated manuscript
Ælfnoth of Stowe (died 700), English hermit and martyr
Sir Thomas Temple, 1st Baronet, of Stowe (1567-c. 1637), English landowner and Member of Parliament
Stow (disambiguation)